In Rock We Trust is the sixth studio album by American hard rock/heavy metal band Y&T, released in 1984 through A&M Records. The album became the band's highest charting album at the time, reaching No. 46 on the Billboard 200 charts.

This album was remastered and re-released on the band's official website in 2006. This edition also includes the studio version of "Go for the Throat", which had never before appeared on a Y&T album. The song originally appeared in live form on 1985's Open Fire album, and was the B-side of their "All American Boy" single. It also appeared on the 1986 hunger benefit Hear 'n Aid compilation album Stars.

Track listing

Personnel
Band members
Dave Meniketti – lead guitar, lead vocals
Joey Alves – rhythm guitar, backing vocals
Phil Kennemore – bass, backing vocals
Leonard Haze – drums, percussion

Production
Recorded and mixed at Fantasy Studios, Berkeley, California
Tom Allom – producer
Andy DeGanahl – engineer, mixing
David Luke, Buddy Thornton – assistant engineers
Nigel James – production manager
Adam Day, Pete Deanda – technicians
Scott Boorey – tour manager 
John Taylor Dismukes – illustration
Chuck Beeson – art direction
Ian England – lighting designer

Charts

References

1984 albums
Y&T albums
A&M Records albums
Albums produced by Tom Allom